Sean Davis (born 20 September 1979) is an English former professional footballer who  played as a midfielder.

He made his professional debut for Fulham in 1996 and went on to make over 150 league appearances for the club. He joined Tottenham Hotspur in 2004. In January 2006, he signed for Portsmouth, helping them avoid relegation and then win the FA Cup in 2008. He moved on a free transfer to Bolton Wanderers in 2009, and following a loan to Bristol City and relegation from the Premier League, retired in 2012. He was called up for England in 2003, but did not play.

Club career

Fulham
Born in Clapham, London, Davis attended Ernest Bevin College in Tooting.

Davis is a product of the Fulham youth system. He is one of the few players in the world to have played at all four professional levels of football in England with the same club and is also the only Fulham player to achieve this.

He made his first-team debut for Fulham aged just 17 years and 25 days in 1996. Davis progressed under managers Keegan, Jean Tigana and later Chris Coleman. At the end of the 2002–03 season, Davis was named as the Player of the Season.

He attracted interest from Everton and Middlesbrough during that season, more so after he had handed in a transfer request citing his "ambition to further his career". However, Fulham were reluctant to sell Davis until they had found a suitable replacement. A transfer to either Everton or Middlesbrough never occurred as Davis was injured during the summer and unable to pass a medical to switch clubs, so this kept him at Fulham for the 2003–04 season. Davis sustained a knee injury in a pre-season friendly match against ASK Voitsberg As a result of his sustained injury, his proposed move to Everton was broken down.

After a month out injured, Davis made his return in the reserve match against Watford on 8 October 2003. A month later, Davis had withdraw his transfer request, as he began dedicating to Fulham by starting a negotiations to sign a new contract. In an exclusive interview with the club, Davis says his attempted move in the summer transfer window resulted fans was questioning his commitment with Fulham. During his club career at Fulham, Davis is the only player in the Club's history to have represented Fulham in all four divisions.

Tottenham Hotspur
After this, he signed for Tottenham Hotspur prior to the 2004–05 season. After starting early season games, injuries restricted his appearances.

Portsmouth
He was unable to break into the Tottenham team and was later bought by Harry Redknapp in the January 2006 transfer window in a combined deal estimated at £7 million which saw Davis and fellow Tottenham fringe players Pedro Mendes and Noé Pamarot sign for Portsmouth. While arriving at the club short of match fitness, he played an important part in Portsmouth's 2006 survival campaign, including scoring the second goal in their 4–2 win over West Ham United on 18 March 2006.

At the end of the 2005–06 campaign, Davis stated that Portsmouth supporters had yet to see his best form, and expected that after having taken part in a full pre-season, that he would be much more prepared to play a greater role in the coming season.

Davis was part of Portsmouth's 2007–08 FA Cup-winning team. Despite not making the squad for the final he appeared in the earlier rounds, including the semi final.

On 1 February 2009, Portsmouth rejected a bid in the region of £3 million for Davis from Bolton Wanderers. Pompey manager Tony Adams was keen to secure the player to a new contract with his present deal due to run until the summer of 2009.

Bolton Wanderers
On 1 July 2009, Bolton confirmed the signing of Davis on a free transfer on a three-year deal. He made his debut in a 1–0 loss to Sunderland on 15 August but made only three more appearances after two major injuries, his last appearance, against Liverpool on 29 August 2009, bringing him the first red card of the 2009–10 Premier League. Davis played for the first time in 27 months on 13 December 2011 when playing the first 45 minutes for the reserve team in a 1–1 draw against Newcastle reserves.

On 24 February 2012, Davis joined Bristol City on a one-month loan deal and made his debut the day after in their 3–1 home defeat to Blackpool, picking up a booking. At the conclusion of the month he returned to Bolton after playing just three games and picking up another injury.

He was released at the end of the 2011–12 season following Bolton's relegation from the Premier League and announced his retirement from football on 25 September.

International career
After a 2002–03 campaign in which he firmly established his position in the Fulham starting line up Davis was called up to be part of the England squad that faced Australia, although he did not play.

Personal life
During his time at Portsmouth, due to influence from teammate Linvoy Primus and the Faith and Football organisation, Davis converted to Christianity.

Since retiring, Davis has returned to Fulham as a columnist and commentator for their home matches.

Career statistics

Honours
Fulham
Football League First Division: 2000–01
UEFA Intertoto Cup: 2002

Portsmouth
FA Cup: 2007–08

Individual
PFA Team of the Year: 2000–01 First Division

References

External links

BBC profile

1979 births
Footballers from Clapham
Living people
Converts to Christianity
English Christians
Association football midfielders
English footballers
England under-21 international footballers
Fulham F.C. players
Tottenham Hotspur F.C. players
Portsmouth F.C. players
Bolton Wanderers F.C. players
English Football League players
Premier League players
Bristol City F.C. players
People educated at Ernest Bevin College